is a 1998 13-episode anime television series produced by GENCO and animated by Triangle Staff.

Story

When his grandfather dies, Kaihei inherits the post of chairman at an eccentric private girls' school which emphasises the personal freedom of its students. But he arrives to find that one of the students has gone missing. As he investigates Melina's disappearance more students vanish, strange events occur and his position is placed under increasing pressure from teachers and parents.

Characters
 

The boy who's appointed chairman of a girls' school, and must investigate the disappearances

 

Kaihei's friend, who must pretend to be a girl to enroll at St Luminous

 

One of the nuns who run St Luminous
22 years old

 

Kaihei's cousin

 

Noriko's friend

 

first girl to go missing

 

Often abandons campus to surf

 

22-year-old pianist who attempts to summon UFOs

 

Dealer in fragrances

 

 

An artist

 

 President of the broadcast club

 Maako, Mei, Dona
 reporters for the broadcast club, also known as "The Three Mermaids"

 

 Ringwald believes she was abducted by aliens

Episodes

External links
 

1998 anime television series debuts
Genco
School life in anime and manga
TV Tokyo original programming